RKHV Volendam or KRAS/Volendam (sponsor name) is a Dutch handball team located in Volendam. Their home matches are played at the Sporthal Opperdam. They compete in NHV Eredivisie and Beneliga.

Accomplishments

NHV Eredivisie: 
Winners (7) : 2005, 2006, 2007, 2010, 2011, 2012, 2013
Runner-Up (2) : 2008, 2015
Beneliga - Benelux Liga - BENE-League: 
Winners (3) : 2010, 2011, 2012
Runner-Up (2) : 2009, 2013
Dutch Handball Cup: 
Winners (8) : 2006, 2007, 2008, 2009, 2010, 2012, 2013, 2014

European record

Team

Current squad 

Squad for the 2021-2022 season

Trainers 
 Mark Ortega - Trainer 
 Christian Albers - 2nd Trainer 

Goalkeepers
 Rob Goudriaan
 Dennis Schellekens 
 Michiel Van Gils

Wingers
RW
  Robin Natgegaal
  Marc Kok
  Filip Pettersson
LW 
  Jordy Baijens
  Leon Geus

Line players 
  Alex Binderis
  Evert Kooijman
  Jeroen Roefs

Back players
LB
  Jelmer De Vries  
  Aboubakar Fofana
  Stefan Van Gils 
  Tim Roefs
CB 
  Florent Bourget
  Wessel Blokzijl
RB
  Marnix Roos
  Zlatko Pavicevic

References

External links

Dutch handball clubs
Volendam